Gagana (meaning: Sky) is a 1989 Kannada movie, starring Anant Nag and Khushbu, produced by Ravikiran Combines.

Plot
This is the love story of a textiles manufacturer owner, Raju (Anant Nag), and his secretary, Asha/Gagana (Khushbu).

Asha, a chatterbox joins as secretary to Raju, a widower. With her dedication, she wins over the disciplined Raju. When Asha's mother reveals to her that she was married in her childhood, Asha is heart-broken. Raju's mother visits Asha's house to comfort her, only to find Asha is Gagana, the kid, who was married in her childhood to Raju. She brings Gagana to her house, but Raju, who doesn't remember the child-marriage and is leading a widower's life after death of his wife Devayani (Mahalakshmi), does not accept Gagana into his life.

The rest of the story narrates how Gagana wins over Raju, his house and also saves him from dangers.

Cast
 Anant Nag
 Srinath
 Khushbu 
 Mahalakshmi
 Vanitha Vasu
 Leelavathi
 Sundar Raj

Crew
 Music - Rajan–Nagendra
 Lyrics - Chi. Udayashankar
 Producer - G. R. Krishnan
 Director - Dhorairaj Bhagavan

Soundtrack

External links
 A movie directory listing for Gagana
 Gagana Movie 

1989 films
1980s Kannada-language films
Films scored by Rajan–Nagendra
Films based on Indian novels
Films directed by Dorai–Bhagavan